Mehroo Dhunjisha Bengalee (29 December 1931  21 May 2014) was an Indian Parsi academic. She served as Vice Chancellor of the University of Mumbai from 1986 to 1992, the first woman to hold this post.

Bengalee earned a master’s in education, followed by a PhD in economics and psychology from the University of Mumbai, in 1965. She started her career at St Xavier's Institute of Education and later became a professor at the St. Xavier's College, Mumbai She served as Head of the Department of Education at the University of Mumbai from 1984 to 1986.

Bengalee was also a former trustee of the Bombay Parsi Punchayet and a founding member of the National Commission for Minorities.

Bengalee died on 21 May 2014, at the age of 82.

References 

University of Mumbai people
1930s births
2014 deaths
University of Mumbai alumni